The 2014 Nebelhorn Trophy was a senior international figure skating competition in the 2014–15 season. Part of the 2014–15 ISU Challenger Series, it was held on 24–27 September 2014 at the Eislaufzentrum Oberstdorf. Medals were awarded in men's and ladies' singles, pair skating, and ice dance.

Entries

Results

Men

Ladies

Pairs

Ice dance

External links
 Entries
 2014 Nebelhorn Trophy results
 2014 Nebelhorn Trophy at the DEU website

Nebelhorn Trophy
Nebelhorn
Nebelhorn Trophy